KYAO-LP (100.1 FM, "RadioKYA") was a radio station broadcasting a Nostalgia music format. Formerly licensed to Ocean Shores, Washington, United States, the station was owned by Ocean Shores Educational Media.

References

External links
 

YAO-LP
YAO-LP
Nostalgia radio in the United States
Grays Harbor County, Washington
Defunct radio stations in the United States
Radio stations disestablished in 2014
2014 disestablishments in Washington (state)
YAO-LP